Chasmanthium is a genus of North American plants in the grass family.

Members of the genus are commonly known as woodoats. One species, Chasmanthium latifolium, is commonly cultivated.

The generic name is derived from the Greek words χάσμα (chasma), meaning "wide opening," and ἀνθός (anthos), meaning "flower."

 Species
 Chasmanthium curvifolium (Valdés-Reyna, Morden & S.L.Hatch) Wipff & S.D.Jones - Tamaulipas
 Chasmanthium latifolium (Michx.) H.O.Yates  -  Indian woodoats - central + southeastern United States (TX + FL to NE + NJ), plus isolated populations in Manitoba, Arizona, New Mexico, Nuevo León
 Chasmanthium laxum (L.) H.O.Yates  - slender woodoats - southeastern + south-central United States (TX + FL to NY)
 Chasmanthium nitidum (Baldw.) Yates - shiny woodoats - southeastern United States (AL GA FL NC SC)
 Chasmanthium ornithorhynchum (Steud.) Yates - birdbill woodoats - southeastern United States (LA MS AL FL NC SC)

See also 
 List of Poaceae genera

References

External links 

 
 

Flora of North America
Poaceae genera
Panicoideae